The International Roll of Honour is a list established by the Scottish Football Association recognising players who have gained 50 or more international caps for Scotland. The roll of honour was launched in February 1988, when 11 players had already achieved the distinction. Each player inducted receives a commemorative gold medal, an invitation to every Scotland home match and has their portrait hung in the Scottish Football Museum.

 there are 34 players on the roll of honour. John McGinn is the most recent addition, having won his 50th cap on 24 September 2022 against Republic of Ireland.

In July 2017, the SFA launched the Women's International Roll of Honour, which recognises players who have won 100 or more caps for Scotland women's national football team. The women's roll of honour initially included 12 players.

Players on the roll of honour
Key

See also
Scottish Football Hall of Fame
List of Scotland international footballers with one cap
List of Scotland international footballers (2–3 caps)
List of Scotland international footballers (4–9 caps)
List of Scotland international footballers (10+ caps)
List of Scotland women's international footballers

Notes

References

Roll of Honour
Association football museums and halls of fame
Halls of fame in Scotland
National football
Roll of honour
1988 establishments in Scotland
Association football player non-biographical articles